Chantal Lefebvre (born June 5, 1977) is a Canadian former competitive ice dancer. With Michel Brunet, she is the 1999 Four Continents silver medallist and four-time Canadian silver medallist. With Justin Lanning, she is the 2000 Nebelhorn Trophy champion.

Career 
Lefebvre skated with Patrice Lauzon early in her career. They placed fourth at the 1994 World Junior Championships.

From 1995 to 1999, Lefebvre competed with Michel Brunet. They were selected to represent Canada at the 1998 Winter Olympics and finished 19th. They won silver at the 1999 Four Continents, in addition to four Canadian national silver medals. Brunet retired from competition in 1999.

Lefebvre teamed up with Justin Lanning in October 1999. They won gold at the 2000 Nebelhorn Trophy and bronze at the 2001 Finlandia Trophy. They were coached by Kelly Johnson, David Islam, and Pavol Porac.

Lefebvre teamed up with Arseni Markov in 2003. However, Markov was unable to compete internationally for Canada until 2005 because ISU regulations mandated a two-year wait when changing countries. Lefebvre and Markov placed 4th at the 2006 Four Continents and won two Canadian national bronze medals. After the 2005–06 season, they changed coaches from Nikolai Morozov and Shae-Lynn Bourne to Elise Hamel and Tyler Myles. Lefebvre and Markov announced their retirement from competitive skating on July 20, 2007. They intended to coach and choreograph.

Programs

With Markov

With Lanning

Results 
GP: Champions Series / Grand Prix

With Lauzon

With Brunet

With Lanning

With Markov

References

External links

 
 

1977 births
Living people
Canadian female ice dancers
Figure skaters at the 1998 Winter Olympics
French Quebecers
Olympic figure skaters of Canada
Figure skaters from Montreal
Four Continents Figure Skating Championships medalists